Currant Creek Dam (National ID # UT10149) is a dam in Wasatch County, Utah.

It impounds Currant Creek for flood control and irrigation, part of the Bonneville Unit of the larger Central Utah Project. The dam is owned by the Bureau and is operated by the local Central Utah Water Conservancy District.

The reservoir shoreline is 85% owned by the Uinta National Forest. Recreation includes fishing (for rainbow, cutthroat, and brook trout, etc.), boating, camping, and hiking.

References

External links
 full description with photos online

Dams in Utah
Reservoirs in Utah
United States Bureau of Reclamation dams
Buildings and structures in Wasatch County, Utah
Earth-filled dams
Dams completed in 1975
Lakes of Wasatch County, Utah
1975 establishments in Utah